2021 Tipsport liga is the twenty-fourth edition of the annual football tournament in Czech Republic. Also, in Malta takes place the third edition of Tipsport Malta Cup.

Groups

Group A
 All matches will be played in Xaverov.

Group B
 All matches will be played in Horní Počernice.

Group C
 All matches will be played in Trnava, Slovakia.

 FC ViOn Zlaté Moravce wintdrew from competition.

Tipsport Malta Cup

Semifinals

Third place

Final

Goalscorers
3 goals

 Adam Vlkanova

2 goals

 Martin Douděra
 Vasil Kušej
 Ondřej Novotný
 Petr Rybička
 Václav Sejk
 Sunday Faleye
 Marek Fábry
 Ondřej Ullman
 Erik Prekop

1 goal

 Rostislav Baďura
 Jiří Boula
 Roman Čáp
 David Čapek
 Václav Dudl
 Lukáš Hroník
 Zdeněk Hucek
 Karel Jakš
 Matěj Jurásek
 Ondřej Kesner
 Jonáš Kneifel
 Jakub Kopáček
 Matěj Koubek
 Štěpán Krunert
 David Látal
 Adam Ondráček
 Václav Penc
 Jiří Piroch
 Václav Prošek
 Daniel Samek
 Miroslav Verner
 Denis Višinský
 Josef Zezula
 Hugo Morales
 Samuel Benovič
 Lucas Demitra
 Matúš Kmeť
 Filip Nagy
 Richard Nemergut
 Stanislav Olejník
 Daniel Šebesta
 Adam Tučný
 Yu Kang-hyun

1 own goal

 Vojtěch Brak
 Juha Pirinen
 Elso Brito

Tipsport Malta Cup
1 goal

 Stefan Hager
 Dominik Radić
 Kryštof Daněk
 Adam Fousek
 Ondřej Zmrzlý
 Nikolai Baden Frederiksen
 Thomas Kotlár
 Zlatko Dedić

References

Tipsport
Tipsport
Tipsport